Police power may refer to:

 Police power (United States constitutional law)
 Law enforcement agency powers
 Powers of the police in the United Kingdom
 Powers of the police in England and Wales
 Powers of the police in Scotland
 Police child protection powers in the United Kingdom

See also
 Police
 Police misconduct
 Coercion
 Power (social and political)
 Social influence